Henry Cox (December 1832 - ?) was an American shoemaker and politician, who served as a state legislator in Virginia. He served several terms in the Virginia House of Delegates. He represented Dinwiddie County. He married and had two daughters.

He was born in Powhatan County. He and his family moved to Washington D.C. about 1881.

References

Members of the Virginia House of Delegates

1832 births
Year of death missing